Fa (Chinese: 發, Fā) was the 16th ruler of the Xia Dynasty, father of the infamous Jie who brought the dynasty to its end.

His given name was Houjing (后敬).

Reign 
Fa was a son of the King Gao of Xia and thus a grandson of Kong Jia.

During his inaugural celebration, all of his vassals gathered at his palace.

The first earthquake ever recorded took place in the 7th year of his rule at Mount Tai in modern Shandong during his reign. The event has been dated to 1740 BC as the Mount Tai earthquake.

The earthquake was mentioned briefly in the Bamboo Annals.

See also 
Yu the Great

References

Xia dynasty kings